Forward Club is an Indian professional football club based in Agartala, Tripura that competes in the Chandra Memorial League. The team is the current defending champion of the 2022 Chandra Memorial League. Contemporary it was the fifth championship. Forward Club is expected to be nominated for the 2022–23 I-League 2nd Division.

Notable players 
 Victor Amobi
 Christopher Chizoba

See also
 Ageya Chalo Sangha
 List of football clubs in India

References

Football clubs in India
Agartala